Attack Squadron 215 or VA-215, nicknamed the Barn Owls, was an Attack Squadron of the U.S. Navy. It was established on 1 March 1968 and disestablished on 30 September 1977. The squadron, based at NAS Lemoore, flew the A-7B Corsair II. It was the second squadron to be designated as VA-215, the first VA-215 was disestablished on 31 August 1967 and had originated the Barn Owls nickname.

Operational history
1 March 1968: Following its establishment, the squadron remained under the operational control of VA-122 during its training in the A-7 Corsair II.
Several squadron personnel were presented with citations from the Secretary of the Navy and the Commanding Officer of Enterprise for heroism during the fire.
16 April 1969: Enterprise, with VA-215 embarked, departed Yankee Station en route to Korean waters in response to the downing of a Navy EC-121 aircraft by the North Koreans on 15 April. The squadron operated in the Sea of Japan and the Yellow Sea until 11 May.
 02 January  1970: The squadron set sail on the  From Mayport, Florida. This was the ships 18th Mediterranean cruise, returning on 27 July, 1970.

December 1972: The squadron participated in Operation Linebacker II, concentrated air strikes against North Vietnam.
February 1973: Following the ceasefire with North Vietnam, the squadron flew combat missions in Laos until a ceasefire was signed with that country on 22 February 1973.
October 1976–April 1977: , CVW-19 and VA-215 made their last operational cruise.

See also

Attack aircraft
List of inactive United States Navy aircraft squadrons
History of the United States Navy

References

Attack squadrons of the United States Navy
Wikipedia articles incorporating text from the Dictionary of American Naval Aviation Squadrons